Prince Ernst August of Hanover (born 26 February 1954) is the head of the royal House of Hanover, members of which reigned in the United Kingdom of Great Britain and Ireland until 1901, the Kingdom of Hanover until 1866, and the Duchy of Brunswick from 1913 to 1918. As the husband of Princess Caroline of Monaco, he is the brother-in-law of Albert II, Prince of Monaco.

Education 
He left secondary school at the age of 15 to work on a farm, but returned to education a bit later to study at the Royal Agricultural College in England and the University of Guelph in Canada.

Ancestry and name 
Ernst August was born in Hanover, the eldest son of Prince Ernst August of Hanover, the former Hereditary Prince of Brunswick (1914–1987) and his first wife, Princess Ortrud of Schleswig-Holstein-Sonderburg-Glücksburg (1925–1980). He was christened Ernst August Albert Paul Otto Rupprecht Oskar Berthold Friedrich-Ferdinand Christian-Ludwig. As the senior male-line descendant of George III of the United Kingdom, Ernst August is head of the House of Hanover.

The title of Prince of Great Britain and Ireland was recognised ad personam for Ernst August's father and his father's siblings by George V of the United Kingdom on 17 June 1914. The hereditary Dukedom of Cumberland and Teviotdale and the Earldom of Armagh, borne in 1917 by his paternal great-grandfather, were suspended under the Titles Deprivation Act 1917. However, the title Royal Prince of Great Britain and Ireland had been entered into the family's German passports, together with the German titles, in 1914. After the German Revolution of 1918–19, with the abolition of the privileges of nobility, titles officially became parts of the last name. So, curiously, the British prince's title is still part of the family's last name in their German passports, while it is no longer mentioned in their British documents. Ernst August continues to claim the style, "Royal Prince of Great Britain and Ireland". However, in addition to being a German, Ernst August also has British citizenship since his father had successfully claimed it under the Sophia Naturalization Act 1705 (in the case of Attorney-General v. Prince Ernest Augustus of Hanover). Since foreign royal titles can't be entered into a British passport, his father ended up being named Ernest Augustus Guelph, with the addition of His Royal Highness. His children, including Ernst August, inherited British nationality under this name.

Family
By a 24 August 1981 declaration issued by his father as the Head of House, pursuant to Chapter 3, §§ 3 and 5 of the House laws of 1836, Ernst August was authorised to marry dynastically, and did firstly marry, civilly in Pattensen on 28 August 1981 and religiously on 30 August 1981, Chantal Hochuli (born 2 June 1955, in Zurich), the daughter and heiress of a Swiss German architect and real estate developer, Johann Gustav (Hans) Hochuli (14 March 1912, in Switzerland – ?), and his German wife Rosmarie Lembeck (8 April 1921, in Essen, Rhine, Prussia, Germany – 12 December 2011). They have two sons, Prince Ernst August (born 19 July 1983) and Prince Christian (born 1 June 1985). Ernst August and Chantal Hochuli divorced in London on 23 October 1997.

In 1988, Ernst August unsuccessfully claimed custody of his infant nephew Otto Heinrich, son of his younger brother, Prince Ludwig Rudolph of Hanover. The infant's mother, Isabella von Thurn und Valsássina-Como-Vercelli, died of cocaine overdose on 28 November 1988. Ludwig Rudolph placed a call to his brother in London, imploring him to take care of the couple's 10-month-old son, and shortly afterwards died by suicide. Custody of Otto Heinrich was eventually awarded, contrary to the expressed wishes of Ludwig Rudolph as the surviving parent and Ernst August's legal efforts, to the child's maternal grandparents, Count Ariprand (1925–1996) and Countess Maria von Thurn und Valsassina-Como-Vercelli (born 1929), to be raised at their family seat, Bleiburg Castle in southern Austria.

Ernst August married secondly, civilly in Monaco on 23 January 1999, Princess Caroline of Monaco, who was at the time expecting the birth of their child, Princess Alexandra (born 20 July 1999). As he was descended from George II of Great Britain in the male line, Ernst August sought and received permission to marry pursuant to the British Royal Marriages Act 1772, which would not be repealed until the Succession to the Crown Act 2013 took effect on 26 March 2015. Similarly the Monégasque court officially notified the government of France of Caroline's marriage to Ernst August, receiving assurance that there was no objection in compliance with the (since defunct) Franco-Monegasque Treaty of 1918. Moreover, in order for Caroline to retain her claim to the throne of Monaco and to transmit succession rights to future offspring, the couple were also obliged to obtain the approval of yet a third nation, in the form of official consent to the marriage of Caroline's father, Prince Rainier III as the sovereign of Monaco.

After their marriage, Ernst August and Caroline moved to Le Mée-sur-Seine, France, where they had purchased an 18th-century manor house from their friend Karl Lagerfeld. In 2009, it was reported that Caroline had separated from Ernst August and returned to live in Monaco.

Controversy
Ernst August was photographed urinating on the Turkish Pavilion at the Expo 2000 event in Hanover, causing a diplomatic incident and a complaint from the Turkish embassy accusing him of insulting the Turkish people. He successfully sued those who published (Bild-Zeitung) the photograph for invasion of privacy, obtaining an award of 9,900 euros.

In 2004, he was convicted of aggravated assault and causing grievous bodily harm after supposedly beating a German man, Joe Brunnlehner, with a knuckleduster on the Kenyan island of Lamu. He has demanded a retrial for the case on the basis of false evidence. His lawyers have publicly stated that he has never owned a knuckleduster nor held one in his hand.

In 2004, Ernst August had signed over his German property to his elder son, including Marienburg Castle, the agricultural estate of Calenberg Castle, the  "Princely House" at Herrenhausen Gardens in Hanover and some forests near Blankenburg Castle (Harz) which he had repurchased in former East Germany after the German reunification of 1990. At the time, Ernst-August's wealth was estimated as high as $250 million. Since then, the younger Ernst August has taken over many representative tasks on behalf of his father. The latter remained in charge of the Austrian family assets. In 2013 however, Ernst August was removed from the chairmanship of a family foundation based in Liechtenstein, the Duke of Cumberland Foundation, which holds the properties near Gmunden in Austria, the Hanovers' main residence in exile after 1866 when their Kingdom of Hanover was annexed by Prussia. Instead, the younger Ernst August was put in charge, reportedly for negligence on part of his father, at the initiative of the foundation's trustee Prince Michael of Liechtenstein. The foundation manages vast forests, a game park, a hunting lodge, the Queen's Villa and other property. In 2017 Ernst August filed legal action to recover his chairmanship, and he intends to revoke the bestowal of his German property. Due to this dispute over family assets, he also declared his intention to withhold consent for his son's marriage to Ekaterina Malysheva which he did not attend.

Health
On Monday, 3 April 2005, Ernst August was admitted to hospital with acute pancreatitis. The next day, he fell into a deep coma, two days before the death of his father-in-law, Rainier III, Prince of Monaco. On Friday, 8 April 2005, hospital officials reported that he was no longer in a coma but remained in intensive care. A report the same day on BBC World described his condition as "serious but not irreversible." After his release he was subsequently seen in public with his wife. In an interview he admitted at the time that his health crisis was caused by his hyperactive lifestyle and problems with alcohol.

His health deteriorated in subsequent years. He was hospitalized again in 2011, 2017 and 2018 for problems related to alcohol. In February 2019 he had another emergency surgery for pancreatitis. One week later, it was reported that he is suffering from throat cancer. In July 2020, he was taken to the psychiatric unit of a hospital after calling the police for immediate help, which was followed by a physical fight between him and the police upon their arrival.

Titles and arms

In Germany, the legal privileges of royalty and nobility were abolished in 1919; thereafter, for legal purposes, hereditary titles form part of the name only.

Arms and monograms

Ancestry

References

External links
Princely House of Monaco
Official site of the House of Welf (in German)

1954 births
Living people
Nobility from Hanover
House of Grimaldi
House of Hanover
Hanoverian princes
Alumni of the Royal Agricultural University
University of Guelph alumni